Mathieu Debonnaire (born 26 April 1987) is a Swiss professional footballer currently playing for Berliner AK 07. He also holds French citizenship.

External links
 

1987 births
Living people
Swiss men's footballers
Association football goalkeepers
FC Lausanne-Sport players
FC Stade Nyonnais players
FC Sion players
Swiss Super League players
Swiss Challenge League players
FC Fribourg players